A regulation is a legal act of the European Union  which becomes immediately enforceable as law in all member states simultaneously. Regulations can be distinguished from directives which, at least in principle, need to be transposed into national law. Regulations can be adopted by means of a variety of legislative procedures depending on their subject matter.

Description
The description of regulations can be found in Article 288 of the Treaty on the Functioning of the European Union (formerly Article 249 TEC).
Article 288

To exercise the Union's competences, the institutions shall adopt regulations, directives, decisions, recommendations and opinions.

A regulation shall have general application. It shall be binding in its entirety and directly applicable in all Member States.

A directive shall be binding, as to the result to be achieved, upon each Member State to which it is addressed, but shall leave to the national authorities the choice of form and methods.

A decision shall be binding in its entirety upon those to whom it is addressed.

Recommendations and opinions shall have no binding force.
The Council can delegate legislative authority to the Commission and, depending on the area and the appropriate legislative procedure, both institutions can make laws. There are Council regulations and Commission regulations. Article 288 does not clearly distinguish between legislative acts and administrative acts, as is normally done in national legal systems.

Legal effect
Regulations are in some sense equivalent to the legislative acts of the member states, in the sense that what they say is law and they do not need to be mediated into national law by means of implementing measures. As such, regulations constitute one of the most powerful forms of European Union law and a great deal of care is required in their drafting and formulation.

When a regulation comes into force, it overrides all national laws dealing with the same subject matter and subsequent national legislation must be consistent with and made in the light of the regulation. While member states are prohibited from obscuring the direct effect of regulations, it is common practice to pass legislation dealing with consequential matters arising from the coming into force of a regulation.

Although a regulation in principle has a direct effect, the Belgian Constitutional Court has ruled that the international institutions, such as the EU, may not derogate from the national identity as set out in the political and constitutional basic structures of the country, or the core values of the protection of the Constitution.

Subclasses

See also
 
 
 
 
 
 List of European Union directives
List of European Union regulations

References

External links
 
 UK House of Commons: Report of the EU Legislative Process and scrutiny by national parliaments.
 EUR-Lex, European Union Law database.

Regulation